The 2016–17 season was the 46th season in the existence of Paris Saint-Germain Féminine and was the club's 30th season in the top flight of French football. In addition to the domestic league, they participated in the Coupe de France Féminine and the UEFA Women's Champions League.

Patrice Lair became the team's manager, replacing Farid Benstiti who left the job after four trophy less seasons with the club. A number of notable players also arrived ahead of the season with Irene Paredes joining from Athletic Bilbao, Aminata Diallo signing from Guingamp and Ève Périsset switching from rivals Lyon. The club also signed Ashley Lawrence a silver-medalist with West Virginia and a bronze-medalist with Canada. Academy product Sandy Baltimore who would become an important part of the PSG first-team in the seasons that followed also made her debut during this campaign.

Competitions

Overall record

References

Paris Saint-Germain Féminine seasons